Ernst Ludwig Krause also known under the pen-name Carus Sterne (22 November 1839 in
Zielenzig, – 24 August 1903 in Eberswalde) was a German biologist.

Initially a student of pharmacy, he later studied natural sciences at the University of Berlin. After graduation, he devoted himself to independent scientific research. He was a prominent and successful champion of Darwinism in Germany. He also maintained an extensive correspondence with Germany's most outspoken popular Darwinist, Ernst Haeckel.

Selected works 
 Die Naturgeschichte der Gespenster. Physikalisch-physiologisch-psychologische Studien, Weimar 1863 – The natural history of ghosts. Physico-physiological-psychological studies.
 Werden und Vergehen eine Entwicklungsgeschichte des Naturganzen in gemeinverständlicher Fassung (11 editions published between 1876 and 1907) – Growth and decay, a history of the whole of nature in a common sense approach.
 "Erasmus Darwin", (30 editions published between 1879 and 2009 in English and German). Published in German as "Erasmus Darwin und seine Stellung in der Geschichte der Descendenz-Theorie" (biography of Erasmus Darwin, translated from the German by W.S. Dallas; with a preliminary notice by Charles Darwin).
 Charles Darwin und sein Verhältnis zu Deutschland (10 editions published between 1885 and 1887) – Charles Darwin and his relationship in Germany.
 Die allgemeine Weltanschauung in ihrer historischen Entwickelung, Stuttgart 1889 – The general world belief in historical development.
 Natur und Kunst : Studien zur Entwicklungsgeschichte der Kunst, 1891 – Nature and art: Studies on the developmental history of art.
 Geschichte der biologischen Wissenschaften im 19. Jahrhundert, Berlin 1901 – History of biological sciences in the 19th Century.
Krause was also the author of numerous articles in the journal Die Gartenlaube.

Notes

External links
 
 Eberswalder Persönlichkeiten  at www.eiszeitstrasse.de (in German)

1839 births
1903 deaths
Charles Darwin biographers
19th-century German biologists
People from Sulęcin
People from the Province of Brandenburg